Mukhametovo (Möxämät) is a rural locality (a village) in Abzakovsky Selsoviet, Beloretsky District, Bashkortostan, Russia. The population was 213 as of 2010. There are 2 streets.

Geography 
Mukhametovo is located 42 km south of Beloretsk (the district's administrative centre) by road. Abzakovo is the nearest rural locality.

References 

Rural localities in Beloretsky District